The Mali national rugby union team represents Mali in international rugby union. Mali are a member of the International Rugby Board (IRB), and have yet to play in a Rugby World Cup. The Mali national rugby team played their first international against Benin in 2003, winning the match. They also defeated Senegal that season. In 2005, Mali made history, by winning their first northern section crown of the CAR Castel Beer Trophy. The popularity of the sport of rugby in Mali is on the rise.

Results summary

External links
 Mali on IRB.com
 Mali on rugbydata.com

African national rugby union teams
Rugby union in Mali
National sports teams of Mali